"South Pyeongan Province" or "Pyeongannam-do" is, according to South Korean law, a province of the Republic of Korea, as the South Korean government formally claims to be the legitimate government of the whole of Korea. The area constituting the province is under the de facto jurisdiction of North Korea.

As South Korea does not recognize changes in administrative divisions made by North Korea, official maps of the South Korean government shows South Pyeongan Province in its pre-1945 borders. The area corresponds to North Korea's South Pyongan Province, Pyongyang Directly Governed City and Nampo Special City.

To symbolize its claims, the South Korean government established The Committee for the Five Northern Korean Provinces as an administrative body for the five northern provinces. A governor for South Pyeongan Province is appointed by the President of South Korea.

Administrative divisions 
Pyeongannam-do is divided into 2 cities (si) and 14 counties (gun).

City 
 Pyeongyang (hangul: 평양, hanja: 平壤)
 91 dong
 Jinnampo (진남포, 鎭南浦)
 11 dong

County 
 Daedong (대동, 大同) (administrative center at Pyongyang)
 14 myeon : Gopyeong, Yongsan, Gimje, Daebo, Namhyeongjesan, Jaegyeongri, Yongak, Busan, Sijok, Imwon, Cheongryong, Yulri, Yongyeon, Namgot
 Junghwa (중화, 中和)
 11 myeon : Junghwa, Gandong, Dangjeong, Dongdu, Sangwon, Susan, Sinheung, Yangjeong, Cheongok, Pungdong, Haeap
 Gangseo (강서, 江西)
 14 myeon : Gangseo, Dongjin, Banseok, Borim, Seongam, Seongtae, Susan, Sinjeong, Ssangryong, Ingcha, Jeokseong, Jeungsan, Chori, Hamjong
 Gangdong (강동, 江東)
 1 eup : Seungho
 5 myeon : Gangdong, Gocheon, Bongjin, Samdeung, Wontan
 Yonggang (용강, 龍岡)
 13 myeon : Yonggang, Gwiseong, Geumgok, Dami, Daedae, Samhwa, Seohwa, Sinnyeong, Ynaggok, Osin, Yongwol, Jiun, Haeun
 Suncheon (순천, 順川)
 1 eup : Suncheon
 8 myeon : Seonso, Sain, Hutan, Jasan, Naenam, Bukchang, Eunsan, Sinchang
 Anju (안주, 安州)
 1 eup : Anju
 7 myeon : Daeni, Dong, Sin-Anju, Yeonho, Yonghwa, Ungok, Ipseok
 Pyeongwon (평원, 平原)
 16 myeon : Pyongwon(Yeongyu), Geomsan, Gongdeok, Noji, Deoksan, Dongsong, Dongam, Seohae, Sukcheon, Sunan, Yanghwa, Yongho, Joun, Cheongsan, Hancheon, Haeso
 Gaecheon (개천, 价川)
 1 eup : Gaecheon
 5 myeon : Bongdong, Buk, Joyang, Jungnam, Jungseo
 Deokcheon (덕천, 德川)
 6 myeon : Deokcheon, Seongyang, Ilha, Jamdo, Jamsang, Pungdeok
 Yeongwon (영원, 寧遠)
 9 myeon : Yeongwon, Daehung, Deokhwa, Seongryong, Sobaek, Sinseong, Yeongrak, Onhwa, Taegeuk
 Maengsan (맹산, 孟山)
 8 myeon : Maengsan, Dong, Bongin, Aejeon, Okcheon, Wonnam, Jideok, Hakcheon
 Yangdeok (양덕, 陽德)
 1 eup : Yangdeok
 6 myeon : Dongyang, Daeryun, Ssangryong, Ogang, Oncheon, Hwachon
 Seongcheon (성천, 成川)
 12 myeon : Seongcheon, Guryong, Neungjung, Daegok, Daegu, Saga, Samdeok, Samheung, Sungin, Ssangryong, Yeongcheon, Tongseon

See also 
 The Committee for the Five Northern Korean Provinces
 South Pyongan Province of the Democratic People's Republic of Korea (North Korea)
 Pyongan, historical Eight Provinces of Korea

Provinces of South Korea
States and territories established in 1949